Mark Gibson (born August 14, 1957) is an American stock car racing driver and team owner. He is a long-time competitor in the ARCA Racing Series, and has also made occasional appearances in NASCAR competition. He helped found the ARCA team Cunningham Motorsports.

Personal life
Gibson was born in Richlands, Virginia, and is a resident of Winder, Georgia. The son of racer Bo Gibson, he grew up in Daytona Beach, Florida, and graduated in 1975 from Mainland High School. He is married, to Jan, who was the daughter of racer Curtis Crider, and they have one daughter, Michelle.

Career
Gibson's racing career began in 1974 when, at the age of 16, he began competing in races at Volusia County Speedway; also running at New Smyrna Speedway, where he won the track's championship in 1979. He began competing in the ARCA Racing Series in 1981, he moved from the Daytona Beach area to central Georgia in 1985, and won the series' Rookie of the Year title in 1986.

A four-time winner in ARCA, Gibson became part of the first two-car team in the series when he teamed with brothers Mike and Joe Cooksey and Don Faurbach from Maurtco Motorsports.

Gibson eventually stepped out of the driver seat to concentrate on developing new talent. He, along with Briggs Cunningham III and Kerry Scherer started Cunningham Motorsports in 1997 as CSG Motorsports, racing in ARCA and the NASCAR Craftsman Truck Series. Scherer moved the team to Charlotte in 2000, but he eventually returned to Georgia and worked with Gibson in the Mark Gibson Racing (MGR) shop from 2007 until 2010. Gibson became a partner, owner and General Manager of car No. 77. In 2009, that team would win nine races and their driver Parker Kligerman won ARCA Rookie of the Year. Gibson has been instrumental in the development of Sprint Cup Series and Nationwide Series driver Justin Allgaier and Truck Series driver Tayler Malsam who drove for Mark in 2008. In 2006, NASCAR driver Brad Keselowski drove Gibson's car at Kentucky Speedway in his stock car debut. Gibson also worked with Timmy Hill, the NASCAR Nationwide series Rookie of the Year in 2011. Gibson won ten races as a car owner.

Gibson is one of the most respected and talented stock car drivers on the dirt miles at DuQuoin and Springfield, Illinois and occasionally enters as a driver in those events to race against the likes of Tony Stewart and Ken Schrader.

Gibson has also run in NASCAR on selected occasions, his last attempt being an unsuccessful bid in qualifying for the 1999 Daytona 500. Gibson's brother Tony was formerly the crew chief for Kurt Busch at Stewart-Haas Racing in the Sprint Cup Series.

Motorsports career results

NASCAR
(key) (Bold – Pole position awarded by qualifying time. Italics – Pole position earned by points standings or practice time. * – Most laps led.)

Winston Cup Series

Daytona 500

Busch Series

Craftsman Truck Series

ARCA Racing Series
(key) (Bold – Pole position awarded by qualifying time. Italics – Pole position earned by points standings or practice time. * – Most laps led.)

References

External links

 
 
 Driver DB Profile
 Catchfence: Mark Gibson Racing Focused On Keeping ARCA Presence In 2012

Living people
1957 births
Sportspeople from Daytona Beach, Florida
Racing drivers from Florida
NASCAR drivers
ARCA Menards Series drivers
Mainland High School alumni
People from Winder, Georgia
Racing drivers from Georgia (U.S. state)
People from Richlands, Virginia
Sportspeople from the Atlanta metropolitan area